The Primary Reserve of the Canadian Armed Forces is the first and largest of the four sub-components of the Canadian Armed Forces reserves, followed by the Supplementary Reserve, the Cadet Organizations Administration and Training Service (formerly the Cadet Instructors Cadre) and the Canadian Rangers.

The reserve force is represented, though not commanded, at the national level by the chief of reserves and employer support. This is usually a major-general or rear-admiral.

The Primary Reserve consists of sailors, soldiers, and aviators who may augment or operate alongside their Regular Force counterparts. Each reserve force is operationally and administratively responsible to its corresponding environmental command; those being the Royal Canadian Navy, the Canadian Army and the Royal Canadian Air Force.

Primary reservists number approximately 27,000 (all ranks, all services). The reserves are important to sustaining CF operations, particularly following the defence budget cuts of the 90s.

Components

Naval Reserve

The Naval Reserve (NAVRES) is the reserve formation of the Royal Canadian Navy (RCN).  It is organized into 24 Naval Reserve Divisions (NRDs), shore-based training facilities located in communities across the country. Each NRD has a small cadre of  reservists and regular force members to coordinate training and administration, but is for the most part directed by the division's part-time leadership.  Training is conducted year round with regular force counterparts at the three Canadian Forces Fleet Schools and reservists frequently deploy on regular force ships to augment ships' companies. Traditionally, the Naval Reserve supplied all personnel (except two regular forces electricians and one marine engineer) for the 12  Maritime Coastal Defence Vessels (MCDVs), which are used for patrol, minesweeping and bottom-inspection operations. However in 2017, MCDVs were shifted to a blended crew model, skewing more heavily to being primarily manned by Regular Force (RegF) members. This change was due to the loss of seagoing billets on larger ships typically manned primarily by RegF members. As of 2012, the Naval Reserve had a funded manning level . It has since grown, in accordance with the Justin Trudeau Liberal government's 'Strong, Secure, Engaged' defence policy unveiled in 2017.

Army Reserve (The Militia)

The Army Reserve of the Canadian Army is the largest part of the Primary Reserve, with an authorized strength of over 18,000 troops. It is sometimes referred to by its original and historic name, the "Militia". During operations the Army Reserve is tasked to provide fully trained and equipped troops to augment the regular army.  It is the time-tested backbone of the Canadian Army and perpetuates the historic force generation mission. In times of national emergency, it is tasked with providing subordinate units (like platoons and companies) and complete units (battalions).  It forms the framework needed to raise a national army during wartime and or insurrection.

This fighting mission has not changed much since the Second World War, when the majority of combat units overseas were mobilized reserve battalions detached from their home regiments. In keeping with this mission, regiments of the Army Reserve exist at cadre strength and have a theoretical administrative capacity to support a full battalion upon mobilization, although they maintain a standing force that can typically deploy the manpower of a reduced company. This perpetuates the regimental system in the reserve army so that it is available as such for the timely absorption of recruits in case of war or in aid of the civil power. Such as when the need may one day arise, to call out more than 27,000 supplementary reservists and cadet instructors (who are also subjected to provide general service), to reinforce the order of battle, bringing it up to war establishment. However, in practice the regimental system exists as an important military institution for Canada.  In addition to the tactical contribution provided for today's Total Force they also provide a deep-rooted community tie and focus on Canada's proud military tradition.

The true strength of the Army Reserve is the strong connection that the extended regimental family fosters with the community.  From coast to coast, regimental depots support Regimental Bands, sponsor Army Cadet Corps, participate in ceremonial duties and parades with some even operating old comrade associations from non-public funds.  Many of these activities are overseen by the regimental honorary colonel and honorary lieutenant-colonel.  Although the vast Canadian geography and demographic factors impact unit composition they mostly functions in much the same way.  During peacetime the Regimental establishment will only be the equivalent of a much reduced battalion of a couple hundred troops and less in some cases.

Normally regiments are commanded by a lieutenant-colonel and consist of a headquarters staff and headquarters company with an administrative and logistical element directed by a small regular force support staff. The regiment's subordinate units consist of one training company that may include a platoon devoted to inducting recruits and another platoon conducting recruit training.  The Training Company provides candidates for basic courses run at the brigade's Battle School and combat arms training conducted at the Divisional Training Centre. Once the soldiers are trade-qualified, they return to their units to serve in the line company (or operational sub-unit) that is ready and equipped to deploy when called to do so.  Each unit will usually deploy a reduced company of two platoons, one of these usually consisting of younger soldiers who have just passed through qualification training.   The line company may be rounded out with a third platoon that is involved with retention duties such as refresher training of mature soldiers (this was once known as warrior training) and holding the non-effective strength, with the goal of returning troops back into the line.

Traditionally the militia has been subdivided into district garrisons, and this system is still used as units are grouped along geographic lines into brigades for the purposes of administration, training and operations.  The deployable sub unit from each regiment are often operationally tasked and grouped together by the brigade to form a composite  battle group of battalion strength known as Territorial Battalion Groups for combined arms training or defence of Canada tasks in the brigade area of operations.

The battle group is usually commanded by a lieutenant-colonel selected on a rotational basis from one of the brigade units.  The order of battle will vary depending on the task and the available manpower but generally includes an artillery battery with 105 mm C3 Close Support Guns, several companies of truck-mounted light infantry with support weapons, an armoured reconnaissance squadron with  equipped with GPMGs/LAW, and a combat engineer troop.  These combat arms troops will be supported by signals, service, medical and military police combat support sub-units.  The brigades are commanded by a colonel and provide a garrison for the reserve units; however, they are usually ready to contribute a battle group to the Division's Task Force and battle school candidates to the Division's Training Centre.  The  June 30, 2016 / Project number: 16-0209 article published in the Canadian Army News stated that the Canadian Army trains 11,000 reservists annually on courses from private to lieutenant colonel.  The number of courses increased in 2014/15 from the previous year and will see a steady state in 2015/16.  The CA continues to generate and train ten Territorial Battalion Groups and four Arctic Company Response Groups each year.

The Army Reserve is a true force multiplier, and the reservists are always very active preparing for battle and training for war.  They are continuously exercised, particularly in the summer months when combined arms field exercises up to the brigade group level are conducted, and also during the wintertime, when the troops must qualify in winter indoctrination and winter warfare exercise.  A high degree of winter training is expected as the Army Reserve provides Arctic Response Companies for Northern service.

They have participated heavily in all deployments of the Canadian Army over the last decades. At the peak of the fighting during the War in Afghanistan, almost a quarter of the troops came from the Army Reserve, thus earning new battle honours for Reserve units.

While not the official name, the Army Reserves are often referred to as the Milita based on their historical name.

Brigades
 2nd Canadian Division
        34 Canadian Brigade Group (34 CBG)
        35 Canadian Brigade Group (35 CBG)
 3rd Canadian Division
        38 Canadian Brigade Group (38 CBG)
        39 Canadian Brigade Group (39 CBG)
        41 Canadian Brigade Group (41 CBG)
 4th Canadian Division
        31 Canadian Brigade Group (31 CBG)
        32 Canadian Brigade Group (32 CBG)
        33 Canadian Brigade Group (33 CBG)
 5th Canadian Division
        36 Canadian Brigade Group (36 CBG)
        37 Canadian Brigade Group (37 CBG)

Air Reserve
The Air Reserve is the reserve element of the Royal Canadian Air Force (RCAF).  2,600 air reservists are organized into flights and squadrons that are attached to Regular Force RCAF wings at various bases.  Air Reserve personnel conduct training to support wing operations.  Air Reserve units are specialized in various areas of surveillance, engineering, and airfield construction. Personnel also conduct further training at Canadian Forces bases and can deploy with Regular Force RCAF crews around the world in support of RCAF missions. Unlike the Naval Reserve and Army Reserve, the Air Reserve is composed principally of former members of the Regular Force and members with civilian qualifications that equate to Air Reserve occupation qualifications.

Air Reserve Units

1 Wing Kingston
400 Tactical Helicopter Squadron
438 Tactical Helicopter Squadron
3 Wing Bagotville
3 Wing Air Reserve Flight
4 Wing Cold Lake
4 Wing Air Reserve Flight
5 Wing Goose Bay
5 Wing Air Reserve Flight
8 Wing Trenton
8 Wing Air Reserve Flight
9 Wing Gander
9 Wing Air Reserve Flight
Air Reserve Flight Detachment Torbay
12 Wing Shearwater
12 Wing Air Reserve Flight
14 Wing Greenwood
14 Wing Air Reserve Flight 
91 Construction Engineering Flight
143 Construction Engineering Flight
144 Construction Engineering Flight 
16 Wing Borden
16 Wing Air Reserve Flight
17 Wing Winnipeg
402 Squadron
17 Wing Air Reserve Flight
19 Wing Comox
19 Wing Air Reserve Flight
91 Construction Engineering Flight
22 Wing North Bay
22 Wing Air Reserve Flight

Health Services Reserve
The Health Services Reserve, with approximately 1,700 members, is organized into two functional groups: Primary Reserve units known as field ambulances, and the 1 Canadian Field Hospital Detachment Ottawa. Core tasks assigned to the field ambulances include force-generating trained personnel to support, augment and sustain Canadian Forces Health Services Group's domestic and expeditionary commitments, to provide health services support to their affiliated Canadian brigade groups and to conduct community outreach activities. The members of the 1 Canadian Field Hospital Detachment Ottawa include specialist clinicians and provide depth and breadth to the Health Services Group on international operations and in military clinics within Canada.

Training and employment
The level of activity associated with being a reservist varies from formation to formation. There are three classes of service  available to Reservists:

Class A

The most common form of employment for reservists; members are employed on a part-time basis within their unit. This form of employment is entirely voluntary, provides no job security and fewer benefits (e.g., medical and dental) than the other classes of service. The Class A contract covers training or employment up to  days.  Class A reservists are generally limited to a certain number of paid days per year.

Most units provide employment for training in the form of one evening per week or two full days a month during the training year (September – April). Units also normally provide one additional evening a week for administration purposes.

Reservists are obliged to accumulate a minimum of 14 full days of service per year and may not exceed  of unauthorized absence during which no fewer than 3 duty periods were conducted by the reservist's unit. Those failing to adhere to these requirements can be deemed to be Non-Effective Strength and can be subject to administrative action.

Class B

This class of service is for Reservists employed full-time in a non-operational capacity. The length of service is dependent on the reservist's availability and the needs of the Canadian Forces. Reservists on Class B service receive many of the same benefits as members of the Regular Force, and for members on terms of service longer than six months duration, almost exactly the same benefits aside from pay. Members on Class A and B service are paid 92.8% of their counterparts on Class C service and in the Regular force.

Class C

This is the operational level of service. Reservists on Class C service receive an increase in pay to the level that a Regular Force member in the same position would be expected to receive (Reservists employed in either of the other classes of service earn 92.8% of the amount their Regular Force counterparts receive). There is no maximum length of a Class C term of service and it is normally in excess of one year. Typically, a reservist in a Class C term of service fills the role of a Regular Force member and is accordingly paid from the Regular Force budget.

Domestic operations

Members of the Primary Reserve may serve in routine domestic operations, or be called up in cases of national emergency as an aid to civil power. This may include rescue operations, disaster management, additional security operations or a threat to national security.

Examples include:

Operation Cadence: security support during the 2010 Muskoka G8 and Toronto G20 Summits.
Operation Lama: the joint humanitarian relief mission in Newfoundland after Hurricane Igor.
Operation Lotus: a military operation to assist flooding victims in the Montérégie area 
Operation Lyre: assistance to flooded communities in southern Manitoba.
Operations Nanook, Nunalivut and Nunakput: the annual sovereignty operations in Canada's North.
Operation Palaci: which supports Parks Canada's annual avalanche control program in British Columbia's Rogers Pass.
Operation Podium: support to security operations for the Vancouver 2010 Olympic and Paralympic Winter Games in February 2010
Operation Lentus: response to forest fires, floods and natural disasters in Canada. Operated as the first entirely reservist task force, TF Silvertip.
Operation Laser: assistance to long-term care facilities in Ontario and Quebec, and remote northern communities during the COVID-19 pandemic

Foreign operations
Overseas deployment on operations is voluntary. Members of the Primary Reserve are required to be selected after volunteering and must undergo workup training before being deployed overseas on operations.

In case of a severe national emergency, an Order in Council may be signed by the Governor General of Canada acting under the advice of the federal cabinet to call reserve members of the Canadian Forces into active service. Members of the reserve have not been called to involuntary active service in foreign operations since the Second World War.

Equipment

Aircraft

The 400, 402 and 438 squadrons are the only air reserve units that operate aircraft. The 400 and 438 squadrons both operate 5 Bell CH-146 Griffon helicopters, while the 402 squadron operates 4 CT-142 Dash 8 trainers.

See also

 Canadian  Militia
 History of the Canadian Army
 History of the Royal Canadian Air  Force
 History of the Royal Canadian Navy
 List of armouries in Canada
 Military history of Canada
 National Band of the Naval Reserve
 Naval Security Team
 Non-Permanent Active Militia
 Permanent Active Militia
 Supplementary Order of Battle

References

External links
 CF Primary Reserve
 Reserve Class of Service

Canadian Armed Forces
Military units and formations of Canada in World War II
Reserve forces of Canada